Stephen Robert Holm (born October 21, 1979) is an American baseball coach and former catcher in Major League Baseball (MLB). He played for the San Francisco Giants and Minnesota Twins between 2008 and 2011, and is currently the head baseball coach of the Illinois State Redbirds.

Amateur career 
Holm attended Sacramento's McClatchy High School, where he played shortstop. He played college baseball at Oral Roberts for coach Sunny Golloway from 1998 to 2001, and earned 3rd Team All-American honors as a shortstop for ORU in 2000. In 2000, he played collegiate summer baseball with the Hyannis Mets of the Cape Cod Baseball League.

Professional career

San Francisco Giants 
He beat Eliezer Alfonzo and Guillermo Rodríguez to earn a position on the major-league roster in  spring training, but got sent down for Eliezer Alfonzo on July 1, 2008. He got re-called on July 23, 2008.

After playing for a short period of time on the Giants in 2009, he was sent back to Triple-A Fresno. Eli Whiteside then became the back-up catcher when Holm was unable to be re-called. Holm was designated for assignment to clear room for Matt Downs on June 16.

Minnesota Twins 
In December 2010, Holm signed a minor league contract with the Minnesota Twins.

On April 14, 2011, Holm was called up to the major leagues during a Joe Mauer injury. After being sent down, he was designated for assignment on May 15. After the 2011 season, he elected for free agency.

Rockies and Marlins
Holm signed a minor league contract with the Colorado Rockies on February 9, 2012. He was released on March 31.

On May 3, 2012, Holm signed a minor league deal with the Miami Marlins. However, on July 5, he was released, after hitting .135 in Triple-A.

Coaching career

Holm coached the 2013–2016 seasons at Sacramento State University, serving as the teams pitching coach.

On July 19, 2016, Holm was hired by Purdue University to serve as their pitching coach.

On June 22, 2018, Illinois State University announced that Holm had been hired as the new head coach of its baseball team.

Head coaching record

See also
 List of current NCAA Division I baseball coaches

References

External links 

1979 births
Living people
San Francisco Giants players
Minnesota Twins players
Baseball players from Sacramento, California
Major League Baseball catchers
American River Beavers baseball players
Oral Roberts Golden Eagles baseball players
Hyannis Harbor Hawks players
Salem-Keizer Volcanoes players
Hagerstown Suns players
San Jose Giants players
Augusta GreenJackets players
Norwich Navigators players
Connecticut Defenders players
Fresno Grizzlies players
Rochester Red Wings players
New Orleans Zephyrs players
Sacramento State Hornets baseball coaches
Purdue Boilermakers baseball coaches
Illinois State Redbirds baseball coaches